Agha Sikandar was a Pakistani television and film actor. He appeared in classic dramas Waris and Dehleez. He also appeared in Urdu and Punjabi films Mian Biwi Razi, Faslay and Jatt Te Dogar.

Early life
Agha was born on 1953 in Lahore, Pakistan and he completed his studies from University of Lahore. 

Agha's father Agha Saleem Raza (d. 1965) was an actor in Urdu and Punjabi cinema, mainly known for his roles as villain during the 30s and the 40s.

Career
Agha was interest in acting and made his debut as an actor in late 1970s on PTV dramas and he did a number of roles in dramas in the late 1970s. He appeared in drama Waris written by Amjad Islam Amjad he portrayed as Farrukh an emotionally son of a widow which was a massive hit. Agha then appeared in philosophical telefilm written by Ashfaq Ahmed called Cinderella Aur Sakina with Saba Hameed. Then in 1981 he appeared in drama Dehleez as Abid Khan a villain role which was also written by Amjad Islam Amjad. Agha also appeared in films and he was offered many films from filmmakers.

In 1981 Agha appeared in film Faslay with famous actress Shabnam and actor Muhammad Ali which was a Silver Jubilee. The following year in 1982 he appeared in film Mian Biwi Razi with actresses Kaveeta, Tahira Naqvi and actor Nadeem Baig which was box-office hit in which he did a comic role with alongside Sangeeta. Agha was offered more offers from directors, they saw him to be a naturally romantic hero. In 1983 he appeared in film Jatt Te Dogar with Sultan Rahi, Mustafa Qureshi, Adeeb and Bahar Begum. Agha was known an emotionally fragile and romantic person and he usually did the roles of characters which were emotional and fragile in dramas quite close to his life depiction of the characters he was given to play.

When Pakistan Urdu Cinema fell into decline and was replaced by Punjabi films, he felt emotional due to some problems and he stopped working in both dramas and films in 1985 his output on both mediums began to decline.

Agha began to use heroin drugs and became addicted to it which made him unpredictable and even more emotionally fragile then he was already. He was sent to Rehabilitation Centre to recover but he was in and out of rehabilitation centres on numerous occasions. Agha tried to rekindle the fame he had between 1970s, 1980s and 1990s, he couldn't find any offers from both dramas and films which droved him into depression. 

He completely disappeared from television in early 1993 but Agha become more addicted to drugs and used the drug then Agha was emotionally battered, haunted and taunted by his addiction and failing to come to terms with the loss of fame he once had and friends. 

In 1993 Agha was found dead which was announced and according to his contemporaries he had utilised only a small portion of the talent.

Personal life
Agha married Rubina, the daughter of actor Inayat Hussain Bhatti and Shahida Bano. 

Agha's sons Aagha Ali and Ali Sikandar are both actors. 

Agha's son Agha Ali is married to actress Hina Altaf.

Illness and death
Agha died of a heroin overdose on 28 May 1993 in Lahore. He was 40 years old. Although some of his co-stars initially suspected that he died from a heart attack, it was later revealed he had overdosed. He was laid to rest at Mominpura Cemetery in Lahore.

Filmography

Television

Telefilm

Film

References

External links
 

1953 births
20th-century Pakistani male actors
Male actors in Punjabi cinema
1993 deaths
Pakistani male film actors
Pakistani male television actors
Male actors in Urdu cinema